Stephen Webber (born June 8, 1983) is the former Chair of the Missouri Democratic Party. Webber served as a Democratic member of the Missouri House of Representatives from 2009 to 2016, representing the 46th District in central Missouri. Before taking office, Webber served two tours of duty in Iraq with the United States Marine Corps. He resides in Columbia. Webber was a potential candidate for Missouri governor but did not enter the race .

Background and education
Webber attended The American Legion Boys State of Missouri in 2000.  He is a 2001 graduate of Hickman High School in Columbia, MO.  He received his bachelor's degree in economics from Saint Louis University in 2006. Webber received his J.D. in 2013 from the University of Missouri School of Law and is a licensed attorney in the State of Missouri.

Career
Webber has served two tours of duty in Iraq with the United States Marine Corps.  His first tour, which began in 2004 and lasted 7 months, found him stationed outside Abu Ghraib prison.  In 2006, he returned to Iraq, this time to Fallujah, as a squad leader of 12 other Marines.

After returning from Iraq, he worked as an aide to Senator Claire McCaskill (D-Mo.) in Washington, D.C.

Webber completed his Juris Doctor in 2013 at the University of Missouri-Columbia School of Law and is licensed to practice law in the State of Missouri.

Political career

Election to State House

Democratic primary
On February 19, 2008, Webber announced his candidacy for the Democratic nomination to replace Representative Jeff Harris as the member for the 23rd District in the Missouri House of Representatives.  Harris, a Democrat, had previously announced he would not run for reelection in order to run for attorney general of Missouri.

Webber defeated opponent Cande Iveson in the August 5, 2008 Democratic primary election, with 3,391 votes to her 1,735, or 66.2 percent to 33.8 percent of the vote.

During the primary campaign, the Columbia Daily Tribune reported that Webber had received a number of "high-powered endorsements" from "education groups, labor unions and a bevy of Columbia political figures" including former Missouri governor Roger B. Wilson and local Democratic booster Bruce Wilson.

General election
Webber ran unopposed in the November 4th, 2008 general election, winning 100% of the vote and making him the youngest representative in the state.

In office
Upon election, Webber and fellow incoming representatives Mary Still and Chris Kelly announced a number of legislative initiatives, vowing to increase funding for the University of Missouri, add "robo-calls" to Missouri's No Call List, increase state restrictions on short-term or "payday" loans, and change Missouri election law to allow early voting.

During his first term as representative, Webber sat on the Rules Committee, a Special Standing Committee on Workforce Development and Workplace Safety, and the Homeland Security Committee.

State Senate election
In April 2015 State Rep. Stephen Webber announced his intention to seek the 19th District State Senate seat. In his announcement Webber described the importance of the Mid-Missouri community,  "When I was sitting in Fallujah, the place I wanted to come back to was Boone County, it wasn't anywhere else in the world," Webber said. "The community has invested a lot in me and I want to make sure we invest in the next generation of Missourians." The incumbent State Senator, Kurt Schaefer, was term limited.

Electoral history

References

External links
Official Missouri House of Representatives profile

1983 births
Hickman High School alumni
21st-century American politicians
United States Marine Corps personnel of the Iraq War
Living people
Democratic Party members of the Missouri House of Representatives
Politicians from Columbia, Missouri
Politicians from Morgantown, West Virginia
Saint Louis University alumni
United States Marines
Lawyers from Morgantown, West Virginia